Baron  was a general in the Imperial Japanese Army and Army Minister during World War I. His son, Hiroshi Ōshima was a lieutenant general in the Imperial Japanese Army, and served as Japanese ambassador to Nazi Germany.

Biography
Ōshima was born in Iwamura Domain, Mino Province (currently part of Ena City in Gifu Prefecture) as the son of a samurai household. He graduated from the 4th class of the Imperial Japanese Army Academy in 1881, where he specialized in artillery and was sent overseas as a military attaché and for studies to France and Prussia from 1891 to 1893.

Ōshima served on the staff of General Yamagata Aritomo during the Japanese First Army in First Sino-Japanese War. During the Russo-Japanese War, he served on the Imperial General Headquarters, and after the war held various administrative and staff positions within the Imperial Japanese Army General Staff. He was promoted to major general in 1907 and to lieutenant general in 1913.

From 30 April 1916 to 29 September 1918, Ōshima was Minister of War under Prime Ministers Ōkuma Shigenobu and Terauchi Masatake. He entered the reserves in 1919 and served as a member of the House of Peers in the Diet of Japan from 1920. From 1940-1946, he was a member of the Privy Council.

Decorations
 1895 –  Order of the Sacred Treasure, 6th class 
 1895 –  Order of the Rising Sun, 4th class 
 1895 –  Order of the Golden Kite, 5th class 
 1900 –  Order of the Sacred Treasure, 5th class 
 1905 –  Order of the Sacred Treasure, 4th class 
 1906 –  Order of the Rising Sun, 4th class 
 1908 –  Order of the Golden Kite, 3rd class 
 1908 –  Order of the Rising Sun, 2nd class 
 1916 –  Grand Cordon of the Order of the Sacred Treasure 
 1916 –  Grand Cordon of the Order of the Rising Sun
 1920 –  Order of the Rising Sun: Grand Cordon of the Paulownia Flowers

References

External links

Notes 

1858 births
1947 deaths
Military personnel from Gifu Prefecture
Japanese generals
Ministers of the Imperial Japanese Army
Recipients of the Order of the Golden Kite
Grand Cordons of the Order of the Rising Sun
Recipients of the Order of the Sacred Treasure, 1st class
Japanese military personnel of the First Sino-Japanese War
Japanese military personnel of the Russo-Japanese War
Japanese people of World War I
Members of the House of Peers (Japan)